The gymnastics competition in the 1999 Summer Universiade were held in Palma de Mallorca, Spain.

Artistic gymnastics

Men's events

Women's events

External sources
 Gymnastics results of the 1995 Summer Universiade
 Results on sports123.com

Summer Universiade
1999 Summer Universiade
1999